Çaxırlı (also, Chakhyrly) is a village in the Jabrayil Rayon of Azerbaijan. Currently uninhabited.

References 

Populated places in Jabrayil District